R. montana may refer to:

Ramanella montana, Jerdon's Narrow-mouthed Frog
Roupala montana, shrub or tree in the family Proteaceae